Békéscsaba (see also other alternative names) is a city with county rights in southeast Hungary, the capital of Békés County.

Geography 
Highway 44, 47, Békéscsaba beltway (around the city) and Budapest-Szolnok-Békéscsaba-Lökösháza high speed railway line also cross the city. Highway 44 is a four-lane expressway between Békéscsaba and Gyula.

Name 
Csaba is a popular Hungarian given name for boys of Turkic origin, while the prefix Békés refers to the county named Békés, which means peaceful in Hungarian.

History 

The area has been inhabited since the ancient times. In the Iron Age the area had been conquered by the Scythians, by the Celts, then by the Huns. After the Hungarian Conquest, there were many small villages in the area.

The medieval Hungarian village of Csaba was established in the 13th century, first mentioned in the 1330s. Besides Csaba, eight other villages stood where now the town stands. According to the Hungarian Royal Treasury, Békéscsaba was an ethnic Hungarian settlement in 1495. When the Turks conquered the southern and central parts of Hungary, and these territories became part of the Ottoman Empire, the town survived, but it became extinct during the fights against the Turks in the 17th century.

In 1715, Csaba is mentioned as a deserted place, but only one year later its name can be found in a document mentioning the tax-paying towns. It is likely that the new Csaba was founded by János György Harruckern, who earned distinction in the liberation fights against the Ottoman Empire and bought the area of Békés county. In 1718, Harruckern invited Slovak settlers from Upper Hungary to the deserted area. By 1847, the town was among the twenty largest towns of Hungary, with a population of 22,000. Nevertheless, Csaba was still like a large village, with muddy streets and crowded houses.

By 1858, the railway line reached the town. This brought development; new houses and factories were built, the town began to prosper. Still, by the end of the 19th century the unemployment caused great tension, and in 1891 a revolt was oppressed by the help of Romanian soldiers. One of the most important person in the politics of the town was András L. Áchim, who founded a peasants' party and succeeded in having Békéscsaba elevated to the rank of "city with council".

World War I brought suffering to the town. Between 1919 and 1920, Békéscsaba was under Romanian occupation. After the Treaty of Trianon, Hungary lost its most important Southern cities, Arad and Nagyvárad (Oradea, both of them today in Romania), and Békéscsaba had to take over their roles, becoming the most important town of the area. Hungarians overtook Slovaks in the 1920s, become the majority according to the census was held in 1930.

Between the two world wars the recession caused poverty and unemployment, and a flood in 1925 did not help either.

Battles were not fought in the area during World War II. However, several events occurred in the town in 1944: between 24 and 26 June 1944, over 3,000 Jews were sent to Auschwitz.

On 21 September 1944, the British and American Air Force bombed the railway station and its surroundings, killing more than 100 people. On 6 October 1944, the Soviet army occupied Békéscsaba.

During the Socialist times, Békéscsaba became the county seat of Békés (1950) and began to develop into one of the most important centres of food industry of Hungary. After the fall of the Communism in 1989, the industry nearly collapsed and many people lost their jobs. However, today the crisis seems to be over and Békéscsaba remained one of the most important centers of the Hungarian food industry.

Demographics

Languages
According to the 2011 census the total population of Békéscsaba were 62,050, of whom 61,912 people (99.8%) speak Hungarian, 10,140 (16.3%) English, 4,821 (7.8%) German and 3,399 (5.5%) speak Slovak.

Ethnic groups

According to the 2011 census  there were 51,842 (83.5%) Hungarians, 1,881 (3%) Slovaks, 402 (0.6%) Roma, 293 (0.5%) Romanians and 170 (0.3%) Germans in Békéscsaba. 9,666 people (15.6%) did not declare their ethnicity. In Hungary people can declare more than one ethnicity, so other people declared Hungarian and a minority one together.

Religion
According to the 1869 census (first modern census in Hungary) Békéscsaba had 30,022 inhabitants, of whom there were 21,988 (73.2%) Lutheran, 5,880 (19.6%) Roman Catholic, 1,043 (3.5%) Jewish, 520 (1.7%) Orthodox and 436 (1.4%) Hungarian Reformed (Calvinist).

The 1949 census showed 45,892 people, 25,661 (56.2%) Lutheran, 14,216 (31.1%) Roman Catholic, 4,750 (10.4%) Hungarian Reformed and 498 (1.1%) Jewish.

In 2011 there were 10,694 (17.2%) Roman Catholic, 8,012 (12.9%) Lutheran and 4,408 (7.1%) Hungarian Reformed in Békéscsaba. 19,650 people (31.7%) were irreligious and 1,027 (1.7%) Atheist, while 16,883 people (27.2%) did not declare their religion.

Tourist sights 

 Great Lutheran Church (Evangélikus Nagytemplom)
 Small Lutheran Church (Evangélikus Kistemplom)
 Saint Anthony of Padua Cathedral (Páduai Szent Antal székesegyház)
 City hall (designed by Miklós Ybl, 1873) (Városháza)
 Mihály Munkácsy Museum (Munkácsy Mihály Múzeum)
 Mihály Munkácsy Memorial House (Munkácsy Mihály Emlékház)
 Mór Jókai Theatre (Jókai Színház)
 Slovak County House (Szlovák Tájház)

Politics 
The current mayor of Békéscsaba is Péter Szarvas (Hajrá Békéscsaba).

The local Municipal Assembly, elected at the 2019 local government elections, is made up of 18 members (1 Mayor, 12 Individual constituencies MEPs and 5 Compensation List MEPs) divided into this political parties and alliances:

List of mayors
List of City Mayors from 1990:

Climate
Békéscsaba has a humid continental climate (Köppen Dfb).

Notable people

Born in Békéscsaba 

 András L. Áchim (1871-1911), Hungarian politician
 Gabriella Budai-Corfield (1974), International Sales Manager
 Ján Valašťan Dolinský (1892–1965), Slovak composer
 Péter Gaszner (1939) Hungarian psychiatrist
 Dániel Gyollai (1997), Footballer
 Gyula Hegyi (1951), politician
 Ágnes Késmárki (1981), singer and songwriter
 Károly Klimó (1936), artist
 Gábor Laurenczy (1954), Hungarian chemist and academic
 András Mengyán (1945), Fine artist, designer, professor
 Enikő Mihalik (1987), supermodel
 Henrietta Ónodi (1974), gymnast
 Béla Szabados (1974), swimmer
 Ádám Szepesi (1945), high jumper
 Margit Tevan (1901–1978), goldsmith
 László Vidovszky (1944), composer and pianist

Lived in Békéscsaba 
 Endre Bajcsy-Zsilinszky (1886-1944), Hungarian politician
 Mihály Munkácsy (1844-1900), Hungarian painter
 Péter Kelemen World Champion Modern pentathlete

Died in Békéscsaba 
 Sándor Erkel (1900), composer, son of Ferenc Erkel

Twin towns – sister cities

Békéscsaba is twinned with:

  Beiuș, Romania
  Krompachy, Slovakia
  Martin, Slovakia
  Mikkeli, Finland
  Odorheiu Secuiesc, Romania
  Tarnowskie Góry, Poland
  Trenčín, Slovakia
  Uzhhorod, Ukraine
  Wittenberg, Germany
  Zrenjanin, Serbia

References

External links

  in Hungarian, English and German
 Photos of the town
 Aerial photography: Békéscsaba

 
County seats in Hungary
Cities with county rights of Hungary
Populated places in Békés County